Third-seeded Lesley Turner defeated the first-seeded reigning champion, Margaret Smith, 6–3, 6–4 in the final to win the women's singles tennis title at the 1965 French Championships.

Seeds
The seeded players are listed below. Lesley Turner is the champion; others show the round in which they were eliminated.

  Margaret Smith (finalist)
  Maria Bueno (semifinals)
  Lesley Turner (champion)
  Nancy Richey (semifinals)
  Françoise Dürr (quarterfinals)
  Ann Jones (quarterfinals)
  Annette Van Zyl (quarterfinals)
  Norma Baylon (quarterfinals)
  Helga Schultze (fourth round)
  Jane Albert (second round)
  Julie Heldman (second round)
  Madonna Schacht (second round)
  Liz Starkie (fourth round)
  Jacqueline Rees-Lewis (third round)
  Gail Sherriff (fourth round)
  Tory Fretz (second round)

Draw

Key
 Q = Qualifier
 WC = Wild card
 LL = Lucky loser
 r = Retired

Finals

Earlier rounds

Section 1

Section 2

Section 3

Section 4

Section 5

Section 6

Section 7

Section 8

References

External links
   on the French Open website

1965 in women's tennis
1965
1965 in French women's sport
1965 in French tennis